The 2019 Porsche PAYCE Carrera Cup Australia was the fifteenth running of the Porsche Carrera Cup Australia motor racing series. It began on 28 February at Adelaide Street Circuit and concluded on 25 October at Surfers Paradise Street Circuit. 

The series was won by Jordan Love.

Teams and drivers

Note: Only  Porsche  911  GT3  Cup  (Type 991 II) automobiles  were  eligible  to  compete  in  the series.

Calendar 
The calendar for the 2019 season was announced on the 21st of October, 2018. The series will return to the Townsville Street Circuit, whilst Sydney Motorsport Park was dropped from the calendar.

Series standings 
The series was won by Jordan Love.

References

External links
 

Australian Carrera Cup Championship seasons
Porsche Carrera Cup Australia